Thomas Keightley (1650–1719) was an English courtier and official in Ireland, who as brother-in-law to Henry Hyde, 2nd Earl of Clarendon played a role in the abdication of James II.

Life
Baptised at Great Amwell, he was the son of William Keightley (born 1621) of Hertingfordbury, Hertfordshire, by his wife Anne, daughter of John Williams of London, (who had married in 1648). Thomas Keightley was appointed gentleman-usher to James, Duke of York, on 2 June 1672.  Keightley appears to have temporarily adopted Catholicism, the religion of his master.

Soon after his marriage in 1675 he sold his property at Hertingfordbury, and migrated to Ireland. On the appointment of his brother-in-law, Henry Hyde, 2nd Earl of Clarendon, to the lord-lieutenancy in the autumn of 1685, Keightley was admitted into intimate relations with the Irish government. He was appointed Vice-Treasurer of Ireland early in 1686, and in July following was sent to London by Clarendon, nominally to attend to his private affairs, but really to keep Clarendon's brother, Rochester, posted on Irish matters, and to maintain Clarendon's influence at court.

Keightley seems to have stayed in London throughout James II's reign, but Clarendon's efforts to induce the king to give his brother-in-law a high place in the Irish government failed. When James II fled from Whitehall at the approach of William of Orange (December 1688), Keightley was sent by Clarendon to the fugitive king at Rochester to entreat him to stay in England. James II saw Keightley on the night of 22 December, but left for France early the next morning.

After the Glorious Revolution Keightley returned to Ireland. In 1692 he was appointed a commissioner of the Irish revenue, a post which he had long sought. In 1696 he was granted Portlick Castle which had been confiscated from Garret Dillon. Many of his letters to John Ellis, dated between 1698 and 1705, are in the British Museum. He welcomed his younger brother-in-law, Lawrence Hyde, 1st Earl of Rochester, who came to Ireland as Lord Lieutenant of Ireland in 1701, and was a lord justice on the retirement of Rochester in 1702. He was commissioner for the Lord Chancellor of Ireland in 1710. Keightley died on 19 January 1719.

Family

His paternal grandfather, Thomas Keightley, born at Kinver, Staffordshire, 28 March 1580, purchased the estate of Hertingfordbury before 1643, when John Evelyn visited him there (Diary, i. 39), and he was sheriff of Hertfordshire in 1651. He may be the Thomas Keightley, merchant, of London, who sat as M.P. for Beeralston in the parliament of 1620–1. He died in London on 22 February 1662–3, and was buried in Hertingfordbury Church. He married Rose (1596–1683), daughter of Thomas Evelyn of Ditton, Surrey. This lady was a first cousin of John Evelyn the diarist, and is described by him as possessing unusual sprightliness and comeliness when 86 years old.

On 9 July 1675 he married Frances, youngest daughter of Edward Hyde, 1st Earl of Clarendon and Frances Hyde, Countess of Clarendon, and sister of the Duke of York's first wife. In January 1713, after an absence of more than twenty years, he met his wife at Somerset House, London. The long quarrel was due, in the opinion of the lady's relatives, to the uncertainties of her temper, and to no fault in her husband. She appears to have had religious difficulties, and was in 1686 living in retreat at Glaslough, where she made the acquaintance of the controversialist Charles Leslie. Leslie may have written his Short and Easie Method with the Deists, 1698, in order to remove her doubts.  His seven sons, all born in Ireland, between 1678 and 1688, died young. His wife and a daughter Catherine, wife of Lucius O'Brien, survived him.

References

1650 births
1719 deaths
Members of the Privy Council of Ireland
People from East Hertfordshire District